Heinrich Sontheim (1820–1912), also known as Honas Bär Sontheimer, was a prominent late-19th-Century tenor and kammersänger (chamber singer) based in Stuttgart, Germany.

Personal life 
Sontheim was born on 3 February 1820 in Jebenhausen, Wuerttemberg, Germany.  His parents were Moses Loeb Sontheimer and Ruchele Rosenheim.  A convert to Protestant Christianity as a young man, Sontheim returned to Judaism in 1847, following the death of his non-Jewish wife. He was a first cousin twice removed of Albert Einstein.

Singing career 
Coached from an early age, Sontheim earned international acclaim in the mid-to-late 19th Century. He was hailed in Germany as "The King of Tenors".  He was known for his roles, among others, as Eléazar in Halévy's La Juive and the title role in Rossini's Otello.  He was given a contract with the Stuttgart Opera, where he sang from 1850–1872. His appearances in Vienna as Eléazar secured his international reputation.

References

External links
Guide to the Papers of Heinrich Sontheim (1820-1912) at the Leo Baeck Institute, New York.

Converts to Protestantism from Judaism
German operatic tenors
19th-century German Jews
German Protestants
1820 births
1912 deaths
19th-century German male opera singers